Richard Rose may refer to:
Richard Rose (mystic) (1917–2005), American mystic, esoteric philosopher, author, poet, and investigator of paranormal phenomena
Richard Rose (political scientist) (born 1933), American political scientist and professor
Richard Rose (footballer) (born 1982), English footballer
M. Richard Rose (1933–2021), president of Alfred University and of the Rochester Institute of Technology
Richard Rose (MP) (died c. 1658), English merchant and politician
Richard J. Rose (born 1935), American psychologist
Richard Rose, a doctor who was involved in the Gary Ramona case